Villa de Cortés is a station on Line 2 of the Mexico City Metro system. It is located in the Benito Juárez borough of Mexico City, directly south of the city center on Calzada de Tlalpan. It is a surface station.

General information
The station logo depicts a helmet of the type used by the Spanish conquerors (conquistadores) who, led by Hernán Cortés, invaded the Aztec empire in the 16th century. The name of this station comes from the area in which it is now located, which was known as the Villa de Cortés in colonial times. The metro station opened on August 1, 1970.

Metro Villa de Cortés provides a transfer with trolleybus Line "M", which runs between this station and the INFONAVIT Iztacalco neighbourhood.

Ridership

Exits
East: Calzada de Tlalpan and Plaza Victoria, Villa de Cortés
West: Calzada de Tlalpan between Guipúzcoa street and Ahorro Postal street, Colonia Niños Héroes de Churubusco

See also 
 List of Mexico City metro stations

References

External links 

Mexico City Metro Line 2 stations
Railway stations opened in 1970
1970 establishments in Mexico
Mexico City Metro stations in Benito Juárez, Mexico City
Accessible Mexico City Metro stations